This is a list of National Hockey League (NHL) players who have played at least one game in the NHL from 1917 to present and have a last name that starts with "E".

List updated as of the 2018–19 NHL season.

Ea–Ek

 Ben Eager
 Mike Eagles
 Bruce Eakin
 Cody Eakin 
 Dallas Eakins
 Robbie Earl
 Mike Eastwood
 Mark Eaton
 Jeff Eatough
 Mike Eaves
 Murray Eaves
 Patrick Eaves
 Andrew Ebbett
 Jordan Eberle
 Tim Ecclestone
 Tyler Eckford
 Rolf Edberg
 Frank Eddolls
 Darryl Edestrand
 Alexander Edler
 Garry "Duke" Edmundson
 Joel Edmundson
 Tom Edur
 Don Edwards
 Gary Edwards
 Marv Edwards
 Roy Edwards
 Pat Egan
 Allan Egeland
 Jack Egers
 Nikolaj Ehlers
 Gerry Ehman
 Christoffer Ehn
 Christian Ehrhoff
 Jack Eichel
 Neil Eisenhut
 Victor Ejdsell
 Aaron Ekblad
 Mattias Ekholm
 Brian Eklund
 Pelle Eklund
 Nils Ekman
 Oliver Ekman-Larsson

El–En

 Anders Eldebrink
 Patrik Elias
 Matt Elich
 Remi Elie
 Boris Elik
 Todd Elik
 Darren Eliot
 Corey Elkins
 Ken Ellacott
 Lars Eller
 Keaton Ellerby
 David Ellett
 Brian Elliott
 Fred Elliott
 Stefan Elliott
 Dan Ellis
 Matt Ellis
 Morgan Ellis
 Ron Ellis
 Ryan Ellis
 Matt Ellison
 Miika Elomo
 Kari Eloranta
 Mikko Eloranta
 Turner Elson
 Pat Elynuik
 Eddie Emberg
 Alexei Emelin
 Nelson Emerson
 Ray Emery
 Steve Eminger
 David Emma
 Cory Emmerton
 Gary Emmons
 John Emmons
 Leighton "Happy" Emms
 Craig Endean
 Shane Endicott
 Brian Engblom
 Jerry Engele
 Deryk Engelland
 John English
 Andreas Englund
 Pierre Engvall
 Jim Ennis
 Tyler Ennis
 Jhonas Enroth
 Tobias Enstrom
 MacKenzie Entwistle

Er–Ez

 Martin Erat
 Aut Erickson
 Bryan Erickson
 Chad Erickson
 Grant Erickson
 Jonathan Ericsson
 Anders Eriksson
 Joacim Eriksson
 Loui Eriksson
 Peter Eriksson
 Roland Eriksson
 Thomas Eriksson
 Joel Eriksson Ek
 Jan Erixon
 Tim Erixon
 Adam Erne
 Bob Errey
 Erik Ersberg
 John Erskine
 Len Esau
 Robert Esche
 Phil Esposito
 Tony Esposito
 Bob Essensa
 Emerson Etem
 Brennan Evans
 Chris Evans
 Claude Evans
 Daryl Evans
 Doug Evans
 Jack Evans
 Jake Evans
 Kevin Evans
 Paul Evans (born 1955)
 Paul Evans (born 1954)
 Shawn Evans
 Stewart Evans
 Dean Evason
 Todd Ewen
 Garnet Exelby
 Randy Exelby
 Bill Ezinicki

See also 
 hockeydb.com NHL Player List - E

Players